The Găujani is a left tributary of the river Boia Mare in Romania. It flows into the Boia Mare near Greblești.

References

Rivers of Romania
Rivers of Vâlcea County